The Telejogo (Portuguese for telegame, with tele being short for televisão, portuguese for television) is a dedicated first-generation home video game console that was released on August 2, 1977 by Philco and Ford in Brazil. It is a Pong clone console and the first video game console ever released in Brazil. The original Telejogo performed well on the market for the time. In 1979, a successor called Telejogo II was released.

Games 
With the integrated MM57100N chipset from National Semiconductor, players can choose from the following three games:

pingue pongue
futebol
paredão

The system output graphics in black and white.

External links 
Telejogo at www.museudovideogame.org
Telejogo at m.tecmundo.com.br

References 

Dedicated consoles
First-generation video game consoles
Home video game consoles
Monochrome video game consoles
1970s toys